Nothing Like Experience is a 1970 Australian film made by Melbourne University Film Society about three students at Melbourne University. It was part of the "Carlton wave" of Australian filmmaking. The film was commissioned by the SRC and the Council of the Student Union.

Premise
A comedy about the 1969 University Arts Festival in Melbourne, featuring three student archetypes: the Cynic (John Romeril), the Enthusiast (Bill Garner), and the Schizoid (Marty Phelan).

References

External links
Nothing Like Experience at IMDb
Nothing Like Experience at Oz Movies

Australian comedy films
1970s English-language films
1970 films
Student films
1970s Australian films